Joanna E. Cole (born January 23, 1948) is an American politician and educator from Burlington, Vermont, in the United States. A member of the Democratic Party, she was elected to the Vermont House of Representatives in 2012, representing the Chittenden-6-1 district, which includes Burlington's New North End. She took office on January 9, 2013.

Early life and career
Born in Troy, New York and educated at the University of North Carolina at Charlotte, Cole taught college-level chemistry, including stints at Millersville University of Pennsylvania and Lebanon Valley College.

In politics

2008 campaign
Cole first ran for the Vermont House in 2008, one of five candidates seeking two seats in the Chittenden-3-1 district. She placed second in the Democratic primary election behind incumbent Bill Aswad, beating the third-placed finisher by seven votes and assuring herself of a place on the general election ballot. In the general election, the two Democratic nominees and the two Republican nominees were chasing two seats. Cole finished third, behind the two incumbents: Kurt Wright, a Republican, and Aswad, a Democrat.

2010 campaign
In 2010, Cole ran again in the Chittenden-3-1 district. This time, there were only three contenders: Cole and the two incumbents. In the general election, Cole once again placed third, trailing Wright and Aswad.

2012 campaign
In 2012, due to redistricting, Cole's home was placed in the new two-member Chittenden-6-1 district, as were Wright's and Aswad's residences. Cole was one of four candidates running, including three Democrats. In the Democratic primary election, she placed first, beating incumbent Bill Aswad into second place. Cole and Aswad proceeded to the general election, as did Republican incumbent Kurt Wright. In the general election, Wright finished first with 2,332 votes while Cole came second, with 2,008. She beat out Aswad by just 21 votes.

Personal
She was director of the League of Women Voters of Vermont from 2007 to 2012. A Quaker, she has served as the representative of the Burlington Society of Friends to the Burlington Area Ministerial Association. She has also served as a Justice of the Peace since 2007.

Cole is openly bisexual. She is married to Sarah Flynn, a retired priest. Her 2012 campaign won the support of the Gay & Lesbian Victory Fund. She is one of six openly LGBT members of the Vermont Legislature, alongside representatives Bill Lippert (D–Hinesburg), Matt Trieber (D–Bellows Falls) and Herb Russell (D–Rutland), as well as senators Brian Campion (D–Bennington) and Becca Balint (D–Windham).

References

External links
Campaign website

1948 births
Living people
Lebanon Valley College faculty
Politicians from Burlington, Vermont
Bisexual politicians
Members of the Vermont House of Representatives
LGBT state legislators in Vermont
LGBT Protestants
American Quakers
University of North Carolina at Charlotte alumni
Women state legislators in Vermont
Bisexual women
American women academics
21st-century American women politicians
21st-century American politicians